The United States has maintained diplomatic ties to Equatorial Guinea since independence in 1968.  Until 1981, US ambassadors served as the contacts to other African countries simultaneously rather than have a separate person just for Equatorial Guinea.

History
In the 19th century, the area of Central Africa that now contains the nation of Equatorial Guinea was under Spanish control. The area was known as Spanish Guinea and included the small mainland area of Río Muni and the island of Fernão do Pó (or Fernando Pó), now named Bioko. Rio Muni became a Spanish protectorate in 1885 and a colony in 1900. In 1926 the island of Bioko and the mainland area of Río Muni were united as the colony of Spanish Guinea.

In 1959, the Spanish territory of the Gulf of Guinea was established as a province of Spain known as the Spanish Equatorial Region. Local elections were held and representatives elected to the Cortes Generales (Spanish parliament).

In 1963 limited autonomy was granted to Spanish Guinea and the people were able to elect members to its own legislature.

In March 1968, under pressure from Equatorial Guinean nationalists and the United Nations, Spain announced that it would grant independence to Equatorial Guinea. A constitutional convention produced an electoral law and draft constitution. In the presence of a UN observer team, a referendum was held on August 11, 1968, and a new constitution was approved. In September 1968, the first president was elected, and independence was granted in October.

The United States immediately recognized Equatorial Guinea and moved to establish diplomatic relations. Albert W. Sherer, Jr., the ambassador to Togo, was additionally accredited as Ambassador Extraordinary and Plenipotentiary to Equatorial Guinea on October 28, 1968, and presented his credentials to the president on November 21. Sherer remained resident at Lomé, Togo.

An embassy in Santa Isabel (now Malabo) was opened August 1, 1969, with Albert N. Williams as chargé d'affaires ad interim.

In December 1969 the ambassador to Cameroon was accredited to Equatorial Guinea while resident in Yaoundé, Cameroon.

The embassy in Malabo was closed in 1995 and its functions were transferred to the embassy in Cameroon. The embassy was reopened in 2004.

Ambassadors

Notes

See also
Equatorial Guinea – United States relations
Foreign relations of Equatorial Guinea
Ambassadors of the United States

References
United States Department of State: Background Notes on Equatorial Guinea
 2006

External links
 United States Department of State: Chiefs of Mission for Equatorial Guinea
 United States Department of State: Equatorial Guinea
 United States Embassy in Malabo

Equatorial
United States